The Amazing Kornyfone Record Label (TAKRL) was one of the first bootlegging record labels in America.  Kornyfone was based in Southern California in the 1970s. The label released albums from such artists as The Beatles, David Bowie, Bob Dylan,  The Grateful Dead, Led Zeppelin, Elton John, Joni Mitchell, Pink Floyd, Genesis, and others.  Kornyfone was known for their packaging, with interesting artwork and informative covers.

According to Clinton Heylin, "Though Dub's output [at TMQ] in the five years separating Great White Wonder from Tales from The Who had outstripped any of his competitors, TMQ's catalogue pales alongside what Ken and co. unleashed between 1974 and the end of 1976. One hundred-plus titles from the flagship label, The Amazing Kornyphone Record Label, were supplemented by represses of Smokin' Pig titles, thirty-two titles on TKRWM (The Kornyphone Records for the Working Man), a dozen double-albums on Singer's Original Double Discs (SODD), 20 releases on the Phonygraf label (Phonygraf), and sixteen releases on Highway High Fi Collector's Edition Records (HHCER) (which regularly appeared with TAKRL or Smokin' Pig labels - just to add to the confusion)." The TAKRL label was active between 1974 and 1977. In 1978 they re-pressed some of their titles with black and white covers.

Releases

1373-RS – George Harrison – US tour 1974 : Let's Hear One for Lord Budda
1374-RS – The Beatles – EMI outtakes	
1375-RS – Yes – Live in Amsterdam
1376-RS – Deep Purple – Glutton for punishment
1377-RS – Queen – Royal American tour
1379-RS – Black Sabbath – Gr'ndlepol
1380-RS – Elton John – Closet keepers
1387-RS – Yardbirds – Golden eggs
1900 – The Beatles – On stage in Japan : The 1966 tour
1901 – The Jeff Beck Group – European tour
1902 – Blind Faith – Recorded live along the U.S tour
1903 – Pink Floyd – In celebration of the comet	
1904 – Cat Stevens – The Hoaxer's midnight daydream
1905 – David Bowie – Dollars in drag : The 1980 floor show
1906 – Fleetwood Mac – Merely a Portmanteau
1907 – Elton John – Rock and roll Madonna	
1908 – Joe Cocker – The lost live album
1909 – Frank Zappa/Mothers – Poot face boogie
1910 – Moody Blues – Grande toure
1911 – Emerson, Lake and Palmer – The callow and cash and idle eyes
1912 – Bob Dylan – Ode for Barbara Allen
1913 – Pink Floyd – Nocturnal submission : robot love
1914 – The Yardbirds – Last hurray in the big apple	
1915 – David Bowie – Good enough to eat : Soft in the middle
1916 – The Who – Decidedly belated response
1917 – Neil Young – The last album
1918 – Mott The Hoople – Behind Enemy Lines
1919 – The Rolling Stones – The Jean-Clarke Mammorial Sonic Barbecue
1920 – Procol Harum – Tales with tangrams
1921 – Buffalo Springfield – Stampede : the gold star acetates
1922 – The Bonzo Dog Band – Loose Caboose
2922 – Bob Dylan – Lovesongs for America : Cast-off Lungs and Retoughed Badlands
1923 – The Mahavishnu Orchestra – Bundled Sunspray Demise
1924 – Steely Dan – Rotoscope Down Pleasantly Retired (A Peak Behind the Curtain)
2924 – Emerson, Lake and Palmer – The 1972 American tour
1925 – Joni Mitchell – Lennie and Dom Songs (Early On)
1926 – Rick Wakeman – Unleashing the Tethered One
1927 – Van Der Graaf Generator – Fellow Traveller
2927 – Elton John – No title	
1928 – King Crimson – Un Rêve Sans Conséquence Spéciale
1929 – Frank Zappa / Mothers – Safe muffinz
1930 – Deep Purple – Perks and tit
1931 – Traffic – On by the way
1932 – Alice Cooper – Parricidal slumbers	
1933 – Pink Floyd – Ohn suite ohm : we've blown (ahhaa!) the clone
1934 – Santana – Flako De '57 Sportshirt
1935 – David Bowie – Last stand : his masters voice
1936 – The Nazz – Twenty/twenty hindsight
2936 – The Who – Jaguar anyone?	
1937 – Lothar and The Hand People – Spores
2937 – Crosby, Stills, Nash and Young – Nice to see you : the nineteen seventy-four excursion
1938 – Chicago – On stage	
1939 – Robin Trower – Guitar bandit	
1940 – The Kinks – Survivors
1941 – The Rolling Stones – Bedspring symphony
1942 – Little Feat – Electric lycanthrope
1943 – Gentle Giant – Playing the foole
1944 – Elton John – Just like strange rain : pink-eyed in paradise part one
1945 – Genesis – As though emerald city
1946 – Elton John – All across the havens : pink-eyed in paradise part two - sourced from a video soundtrack of the Hammersmith Odeon show of 24 December 1974. 	
1947 – Sparks – One and a half-Nelson
1948 – Michael Giles/Peter Giles/Robert Fripp – The cheerful insanity of Giles, Giles and Fripp
1949 – Joni Mitchell – (Kept on) by her own devices
2949 – Jethro Tull – Supercharged again : the 1973 American tour
1950 – The Outlaws – Another roadside attraction	
2950 – The Beatles – Hahst Az Sön : Two Weeks in January Nineteen Sixty-nine
1951 – Bad Company – Scrapbook
1952 – Bob Dylan – Are you now or have you ever been?	
1953 – Roxy Music – Champagne and novocaine	
1954 – The Doors – Moonlight drive
1955 – Genesis – The bedside yellow foam
1956 – Little Feat – Aurora backseat
2956 – The London Symphony Orchestra – Tommy recorded live at the Rainbow
1957 – Queen – Sheetkeeckers
1958 – 10CC – Going pink on purpose
1959 – The Jimi Hendrix Experience – Pipe dream
1960 – Steve Miller Band – The midnight toker
2960 – Led Zeppelin – 1975 World tour
1961 – Bad Company – Boblingen
1962-RS – Bob Dylan – Royal Albert Hall
1963 – Bob Dylan – Now your mouth cries wolf
1964 – Boz Scaggs – Jump street jive drive
2964 – Led Zeppelin – Live in Seattle
2965 – David Bowie – Live at Santa Monica Civic
1966-RS – Led Zeppelin – Cellarful of noise (with Live in Japan subtitle)
1967-RS – Bad Company – Live in Japan
1968 – King Crimson – Heretic
3969 – Pink Floyd – Crackers	
1970 – The Kinks – Don't touch that dial!
1971 – Beck, Bogert & Appice – Somewhere over the rainbow
1972 – Bob Dylan – Joaquin antique 	
1973 – Pink Floyd – Raving and drooling	
1974 – Electric Light Orchestra – Wholly Edison
1975 – Genesis – Awed man out
1976 – Little Feat – Beak positive
1977 – Roxy Music  – Foolproof
1978 – Roxy Music  – Absinthe makes the heart grow fondle
2979 – Grateful Dead – Make believe ballroom
1980 – Gram Parsons/The International Submarine Band  – The devil and the deep blue sea
2980 – Genesis – Swelled and spent	
1981 – Yes – The Affirmery
1982 – Patti Smith Group – Canine teardrop
2982 – Bob Dylan – passed over and rolling thunder
1983 – Gentle Giant  – Among the darkers
1984 – Groucho Marx – I never kissed an ugly woman
1990 – Procol Harum – Five and a dime	
1991 – The Tubes – Darted in my armchair
1992 – Little Feat – Rampant Syncopatio
1993 – Jackson Browne – The return of the common man	
1994 – Electric Light Orchestra – Freedom city pandemonium
2995 – David Bowie – Resurrection on 84th street
1996 – Todd Rundgren/Utopia  – Nimbus Thitherward
1997 – Queen – Command performance
1999 – Bob Dylan – Bridgett's album
24900 – Bob Dylan – Live in Adelaide Australia 1978
24901 – Eagles – Crazed & snake-eyed
24902 – Fleetwood Mac – Will the real Fleetwood Mac please stand up
24903 – Bruce Springsteen – You can trust your car to the man who wears the star
24904 – Rainbow – Live in Australia
24905 – Genesis – Live in Newcastle 1973
24906 – Genesis – Recorded live at the Felt Forum
24907 – Frank Zappa/ Mothers – No commercial potential
24909 – Rolling Stones – Nasty songs
24910 – Bob Dylan – The Hurricane Carter benefit
24911 – Elvis Presley – Memories
24912 – Elvis Presley – Trouble bound
24913 – Elvis Presley – The Vegas years
900 – Bob Dylan – Royal Albert Hall
901 – Elvis Costello – The Kornyfone Radio hour
902 – Fleetwood Mac – The rockhoppers live in Japan
903 – Patti Smith – Hard nipples
904 – Emerson, Lake and Palmer – The 1978 world tour
905 – Supertramp – The 1986 American tour
906 – Crosby, Nash & Young – Waterbrothers
907 – Aerosmith – Look homeward angel
908 – Neil Young – The 1970 Carnegie Hall show
909 – Fleetwood Mac – Offhand
910 – Led Zeppelin – Ballcrusher
911 – Jefferson Starship – Fasten your seatbelt
912 – Patti Smith – In heat
913 – Deep Purple – Guitar Slaughterhouse
914 – Deep Purple – Live in London
915 – Yes – Live at the Rainbow
916 – Sex Pistols – Live at Winterland
918 – Led Zeppelin – Live in England 1976
919 – Patti Smith – Teenage perversity and ships in the night
920 – Graham Parker – Pub rockin'
921 – Lynyrd Skynyrd – Flying high
922 – Fleetwood Mac – Play the city of the angels
923 – Babys – Spoiled brats
924 – Tom Petty – Heartbreak in N.Y.
925 – Linda Ronstadt – Wishin' I was a cub scout
926 – Foreigner – First time around
927 – Queen – Royal rock us
928 – Elvis Costello – Revelations From The Very Middle 
929 – Sex Pistols – Sex Pistols
930 – Rush – Around the world recorded live
932 – Genesis – Recorded live at Marquee Club
933 – Genesis – Recorded live at Carnegie Hall 1973
950 – Devo – Sing if you're glad to be Devo
957 – Supertramp – Montreal 77
Bozo1 – Various Artists – T'anks for the mammaries
1985 The Cult- Some Zip Gun Boogies. Sides one and two were recorded at the Underground Club on Nov. 14, 1985, and sides three and four were recorded in Italy sometime in 1986.

See also
 List of record labels

References

External links

American independent record labels
Rock record labels
Pop record labels
Defunct record labels of the United States